Rolf Huisgen (13 June 1920 – 26 March 2020) was a German chemist. His importance in synthetic organic chemistry extends to the enormous influence he had in post-war chemistry departments in Germany and Austria, due to a large number of his habilitants becoming professors. His major achievement was the development of the 1,3-dipolar cycloaddition reaction, also called the Huisgen cycloaddition.

Life 
Huisgen was born in Gerolstein in Rhineland-Palatinate and studied in Munich under the supervision of Heinrich Otto Wieland. He completed his Ph.D. in 1943 with a thesis about a strychnine alkaloid. He completed his habilitation in 1947, and was appointed professor at the University of Tübingen in 1949. He returned to the University of Munich in 1952, succeeding Wieland, and he remained dedicated to research long after attaining emeritus status there in 1988.

One of his major achievements was the development of the 1,3-dipolar cycloaddition reaction, also known as the Huisgen cycloaddition or Huisgen reaction. The Huisgen reaction is of paramount importance to the synthesis of heterocyclic compounds, such as vitamins, alkaloids and antibiotics.

Huisgen was a member of the American Academy of Arts and Sciences from 1960. He was also a member of the German National Academy of Sciences Leopoldina and an Honorary Fellow of the Royal Society of Chemistry. He was an Honorary Member of the Gesellschaft Deutscher Chemiker and the Chemical Society of Japan. He was awarded the Liebig Medal in 1961, the Lavoisier Medal from the Société Chimique de France in 1965, and the Adolfo Quilico Medal from the Società Chimica Italiana in 1987, among others. He was elected to the National Academy of Sciences in 1989. He received several honorary doctorates, including from the FU Berlin in 2010.

Sixteen of his students became professors in Germany alone, including , Johann Gasteiger, Bernd Giese, Johann Mulzer, Hans-Ulrich Reissig,  and Ivar Karl Ugi.

Personal life
His daughter, mathematician Birge Huisgen-Zimmermann, was born in 1946. He died in Munich on 26 March 2020, aged 99.

Publications

References

Literature

External links 

 
 Rolf Huisgen: The Chemical Adventurer scripps.edu
 Prof. Dr. Rolf Huisgen, em. Faculty of Chemistry and Pharmacy, LMU Munich

1920 births
2020 deaths
People from Gerolstein
20th-century German chemists
Ludwig Maximilian University of Munich alumni
Academic staff of the Ludwig Maximilian University of Munich
Foreign associates of the National Academy of Sciences